Nonito Donaire vs. Omar Narváez was a boxing bantamweight championship fight for the WBC and WBO world titles. Donaire made his first and only title defense against junior bantamweight titleholder Omar Narvaez. Shortly after the most significant win of his career, a highlight reel knockout of Mexico's Fernando Montiel, Donaire left Top Rank and signed with rival Golden Boy Promotions.  The deal was put on hold when an arbitrator upheld Top Rank's contract and enjoined Golden Boy from promoting Donaire. Eventually, Donaire worked out his differences with Top Rank, which signed him to a contract extension in mid-July.

Background

Donaire 
Donaire enters this fight riding a nine-year, 25-bout winning streak, which includes an IBF/IBO Flyweight title knockout victory of defending champion Vic Darchinyan, and a fourth-round blasting of former WBA Bantamweight champion Wladimir Sidorenko last December. However, Donaire's most impressive victory occurred in his last fight, on February 19, when he knocked out defending WBC/WBO Bantamweight champion Fernando Montiel in the second round, ending Montiel's 25-bout winning streak while also claiming his third world title in as many weight divisions. Ten of Donaire's last 11 victories have come by way of knockout.

Narvaez 
Omar will be making his U.S. debut. Narvaez successfully defended his title 16 times during his seven-year reign before vacating it in early 2010 to campaign at a heavier weight class.  He won the vacant WBO Super Flyweight title in May 2010, pitching a near shutout to win a unanimous decision over Everth Briceno.  Narvaez, one of Argentina's most popular fighters, has successfully defended his new title three times, all by unanimous decision, against opponents who had a combined record of 54-2 when he fought them.

Undercard

Televised
Bantamweight Unified Championship bout:  Nonito Donaire (c)   vs.  Omar Narvaez
Donaire defeated Narvaez via Unanimous Decision (120-108, 120-108, 120-108).

Preliminary card

Featherweight bout:  Mikey Garcia vs.  Juan Carlos Martinez
Garcia defeated Martinez via TKO at 2:46 of the fourth round.

Lightweight bout:  Michael Brooks vs.  Eddie Ramirez
Brooks defeated Ramirez via Unanimous Decision (40-36, 40-36, 40-36).

Welterweight bout:  Tommy Rainone vs.  Brad Jackson
Rainone defeated Jackson via Unanimous Decision. (60-54. 59-55, 58-56).

Super Welterweight bout:  Mikaël Zewski vs.  Keuntray Henson
Zewski defeated Henson via KO at 1:27 of the first round.

Light Heavyweight bout:  Sean Monaghan vs.  Anthony Pietrantonio
Monaghan defeated Pietrantonio via TKO at 2:51 of the fifth round.

Super Flyweight bout:  Jonathan González vs.  Jose Rivera
González defeated Rivera via Unanimous Decision. (60-53, 60-53, 59-54).

Welterweight bout:  Cletus Seldin vs.  Jose Segura Torres	
Seldin defeated Torres via TKO at 2:52 of the second round.

Reported fight earnings
Nonito Donaire $725,000 vs. Omar Narvaez $250,000
Mikey Garcia $100,750 vs. Juan Carlos Martinez $15,300

International Broadcasting

Notes

See also

2011 in boxing
2011 in sports in New York City
2010s in Manhattan
Boxing matches at Madison Square Garden
Boxing on HBO
October 2011 sports events in the United States